Years and Years is a dystopian science fiction drama television miniseries written by Russell T Davies. Taking place between 2019 and 2034, the six-part series follows the lives of the Lyons family, who witness increasingly tumultuous global affairs and the rise to power of Vivienne Rook, an outspoken British celebrity businesswoman turned populist politician whose controversial opinions divide the nation. The series was a co-production between the BBC and HBO, and premiered on BBC One on 14 May 2019 and on HBO on 24 June 2019. Years and Years stars Emma Thompson as Rook, alongside Russell Tovey, Rory Kinnear, T'Nia Miller, Ruth Madeley, Anne Reid, and Jessica Hynes as the Lyons family.

The series was directed by Simon Cellan Jones (episodes 1–4) and Lisa Mulcahy (episodes 5–6), with Davies, Jones, Michaela Fereday, Lucy Richer, and Nicola Shindler serving as executive producers. It received praise for its writing, characterisation, and exploration of modern political anxieties in a dystopian future. The show received three nominations at the 10th Critics' Choice Television Awards, in the categories of Best Limited Series, Best Supporting Actor in a Movie/Miniseries (for Tovey), and Best Supporting Actress in a Movie/Miniseries (for Thompson).

Plot
The six-part series follows the Manchester-based Lyons family: Daniel is married to Ralph, Stephen and Celeste worry about their children, Rosie is looking for a new partner, and Edith is engaged in one humanitarian cause after another. Presiding over them all is Gran, the imperious Muriel. All their lives converge on one crucial night in 2019, and the story accelerates into the future, following the lives and loves of the Lyons over the next fifteen years as Britain is rocked by political upheavals, economic instability and technological advances.

Cast and characters

Main
 The Lyons siblings:
 Rory Kinnear as Stephen Lyons, the oldest Lyons sibling, a financial advisor who lives in London with his wife, Celeste, and their two daughters. 
 Russell Tovey as Daniel Lyons, a housing officer based in Manchester.
 Jessica Hynes as Edith Lyons, a political activist.
 Ruth Madeley as Rosie Lyons, the youngest of the Lyons siblings, who has spina bifida. She is a single mother, has two sons, Lee and Lincoln, and works in a school cafeteria.
 T'Nia Miller as Celeste Bisme-Lyons, an accountant and Stephen's wife.
 Anne Reid as Muriel Deacon, the Lyons siblings' grandmother.
 Emma Thompson as The Rt Hon Vivienne Rook MP, a charismatic and controversial businesswoman turned politician.

Recurring
 Dino Fetscher as Ralph Cousins, Daniel's ex-husband, who is a primary school teacher.
 Maxim Baldry as Viktor Goraya, a Ukrainian refugee, who forms a romantic relationship with Daniel.
 Lydia West as Bethany Bisme-Lyons, Stephen and Celeste's older daughter, who identifies as transhuman, wishing to turn herself into data.
 Jade Alleyne as Ruby Bisme-Lyons, Stephen and Celeste's younger daughter.
 Sharon Duncan-Brewster as Fran Baxter, a storyteller and activist who is Daniel's friend. She later becomes Edith's partner.

Production
In June 2018, the BBC announced that Russell T Davies would write Years and Years, which was described as "an epic drama following a family over 15 years of unstable political, economical and technological advances". Davies noted that he had been aiming to write the drama series for almost two decades.

In October 2018, it was announced that Emma Thompson had joined the cast as Vivienne Rook (who shares a name with another of Davies' characters, a journalist in the Doctor Who episode "The Sound of Drums"), alongside Rory Kinnear, T'Nia Miller, Russell Tovey, Jessica Hynes, Lydia West, Ruth Madeley, and Anne Reid. Years and Years was cast by Andy Pryor. It was also announced that the series would be directed by Simon Cellan Jones.

Filming began in Manchester on 22 October 2018 and was completed on 17 March 2019. Locations included Trafford Park for the refugee camp and Altcar Training Camp, Liverpool for the "Erstwhile" site.

Episodes

Broadcast
The series was broadcast on BBC One in the UK, BBC First in The Netherlands and Belgium, HBO in the US, Mexico, Latin America, Poland, and Spain, SBS in Australia, Soho in New Zealand, Canal+ in France, and ZDF in Germany.

In 2020, the series aired on M-Net in South Africa.

Reception

Critical reception
On the review aggregator website Rotten Tomatoes, the series holds an approval rating of 89% based on 66 critics' reviews, with an average score of 7.30/10. The site's critical consensus reads, "Years and Years scathingly critiques the present with a nihilistic projection of the future, leavening the devastating satire with a buoyant sense of humour and characters who are easy to become invested in." On Metacritic, the series has a weighted average score of 78 out of 100, based on 24 critics, indicating "generally favorable reviews".

US ratings

Censorship in China
The series has been banned in China. Shortly after the premiere of the first episode, the show received an excellent rating of 9.5/10 on Douban, the largest movie review aggregator website in China, before being banned across Chinese search engines and social media. Relevant entries and posts, or even references to the name of the show, were filtered or promptly deleted from websites like Baidu and Weibo. Files with names containing "Years and Years" were taken down from the cloud storage service Baidu Wangpan. It is commonly believed that the censorship was due to the depiction of Chinese leader Xi Jinping and the military confrontation between China and America in the South China Sea, which are deemed sensitive topics in China.

References

External links
 
 

2010s British drama television series
2010s British political television series
2019 British television series debuts
2019 British television series endings
BBC high definition shows
British political drama television series
British science fiction television shows
BBC television dramas
Climate change in fiction
Dystopian television series
English-language television shows
Television shows written by Russell T Davies
Immigration in fiction
Television series by Red Production Company
Television series by StudioCanal
Television series about families
Television series created by Russell T Davies
Television series set in 2019
Television series set in the 2020s
Television series set in the 2030s
Television shows set in Manchester
2010s British LGBT-related drama television series